Bassem Srarfi (born 25 June 1997) is a Tunisian professional footballer who plays as a midfielder for Kuwaiti club Al-Arabi and the Tunisia national team.

Club career

Early career
Srarfi started in the youth ranks of Tunisian clubs Stade Tunisien and Club Africain respectively, he subsequently made his first-team debut for the latter on 20 November 2015 in a Tunisian Ligue Professionnelle 1 draw against EGS Gafsa. Three games later, Srarfi scored his first professional goal in a 2–2 draw away to Hammam-Lif.

Nice
On 1 February 2017, Srarfi joined Ligue 1 side Nice. The transfer was subject to international clearance, but it was successfully approved hours later by the French Football Federation and Tunisian Football Federation. He made his Nice debut on 24 February in Ligue 1 against Montpellier. He has also featured for Nice II in the Championnat National 2. His first goal in French football came for Nice II, in a loss to Stade Montois on 28 October.

On 29 November 2017, he scored his first goal for Nice's first team in Ligue 1, helping his team to a 2–1 win against Toulouse in stoppage time.

Zulte Waregem
In January 2020, Srarfi completed a transfer to Belgian First Division A outfit Zulte Waregem. His contract with Zulte Waregem was terminated by mutual consent in the summer of 2022.

International career
Srarfi received his first call-up for the Tunisia national team in August 2017, with Nabil Maâloul selecting him in the squad for the 2018 FIFA World Cup qualifiers versus DR Congo. He was an unused substitute in both fixtures. Srarfi made his senior debut for Tunisia in a 1–0 friendly win over Iran on 23 March 2018. In the following May, he was named in Tunisia's preliminary squad for the 2018 FIFA World Cup. He was selected in the final 23. He made his World Cup debut on 28 June, as Tunisia exited the tournament with victory versus Panama. Srarfi made Alain Giresse's squad for the 2019 Africa Cup of Nations.

Career statistics

Club

International

International goals
As of 7 June 2019. Tunisia score listed first.

References

External links

1997 births
Footballers from Tunis
Living people
Tunisian footballers
Tunisia international footballers
Association football midfielders
Stade Tunisien players
Club Africain players
OGC Nice players
S.V. Zulte Waregem players
Al-Arabi SC (Kuwait) players
Tunisian Ligue Professionnelle 1 players
Ligue 1 players
Championnat National 2 players
Belgian Pro League players
2018 FIFA World Cup players
2019 Africa Cup of Nations players
Tunisian expatriate footballers
Tunisian expatriate sportspeople in France
Expatriate footballers in France
Tunisian expatriate sportspeople in Belgium
Expatriate footballers in Belgium
Tunisian expatriate sportspeople in Kuwait
Expatriate footballers in Kuwait